Ng Akew (died 1880), was a Chinese opium smuggler and house owner in Hong Kong. She was the central figure in a pirate scandal in 1849, which attracted great attention as a cause célèbre. 

Ng Akew was a Tanka slave of the American opium smuggler James Bridges Endicott (1814–1870) in Hong Kong, and seem to have been involved in his business. In 1849, he gave her a share of his cargo, which she sold along the coast from her own boats. When her boat and cargo was stolen by pirates, she traveled herself to the pirate base and negotiated compensation. Shortly after, an American ship was attacked and its cargo stolen by a pirate ship with Ng Akew present. The stolen cargo was later discovered in her own ship. It was assumed that she had negotiated with the pirates that the cargo from their next pirate attack would go to her as compensation for the cargo they stole from her. Her guilt could not be proven in court and she was therefore freed, but the case became famous in her time. 

When Bridges Endicott retired to Macao he provided her with land in Hong Kong, and she became a wealthy house owner.

References 
 Lily Xiao Hong Lee, Clara Lau, A.D. Stefanowska: Biographical Dictionary of Chinese Women: v. 1: The Qing Period, 1644-1911 

19th-century births
1880 deaths
19th-century pirates
British Hong Kong
Chinese slaves
Hong Kong women
Chinese pirates
Chinese female pirates
Tanka people
19th-century Chinese businesswomen
19th-century Chinese businesspeople
19th-century Hong Kong people
19th-century slaves